Michel Armand Guy Pagliaro (born 9 November 1948) is a Canadian rock singer, songwriter and guitarist from Montreal, Quebec. Pagliaro was nominated for a 1975 Juno Award as male vocalist of the year. Although he writes and records predominantly in French, Pagliaro’s has reached international success mainly with material released in English.

Career
Pagliaro's first nationally English-charted hit was his 1970 single "Give Us One More Chance". Other significant hits in English include "Lovin' You Ain't Easy" (1971) which reached Number 31 on the UK Singles Chart in February 1972, "Rainshowers" (1972), "Some Sing Some Dance" (1972), and "What The Hell I Got" (1975). Pagliaro was the first Canadian artist to score top 40 hits on both the anglophone and francophone pop charts in Canada.

Michel Pagliaro also produced the first album of his son Roman's group, Les Fous de la Reine, which won both Musiqualité and Diapason music contests in 2014. Their first two singles, La Guillotine and La face cachée de la neige were met with positive reception and played regularly on commercial radio stations, notably CKOI-FM. He continued to perform.

Awards
At the Juno Awards of 1975, Pagliaro was nominated for the Male Vocalist of the Year award. Pagliaro received the Governor General's Performing Arts Award for Lifetime Artistic Achievement, Canada's highest honour in the performing arts, in 2008. His song "J'entends frapper", a major hit in Quebec, was inducted into the Canadian Songwriters Hall of Fame in 2010.

In 2002, Pagliaro was the recipient of the National Achievement Award at the annual Francophone SOCAN Awards held in Montreal.

Discography

Studio albums
Although several of Pagliaro's albums have the same title, releases listed are not reissues.

Live albums

Singles

Compilations

Collaborations and performances as guest star
 1966 Les Chanceliers (Citation); Reissued partially in 1969 Le P'tit Poppy (Tradition)
 1968 Reels Psychadeliques, vol. 1 (with Ouba) (Revolution)
 1968 Reels Psychadeliques, vol. 2 (with Ouba) (Revolution)
 1971 Pagliaro & Martel (with Renée Martel) (Trans-World, Compilation)
 1972 Michel Pagliaro et les Chanceliers (Tradition, Compilation)
 1975 Patof – Patof Rock. Michel Pagliaro : electric guitars (uncredited) (Campus)
 1993 Au nom de l'amour.  Héros (new recording); Au nom de l'amour (with the group). (other songs by various artists) (Au Nom de l'Amour)
 1994 Jacques Higelin – Aux héros de la voltige. Michel Pagliaro : electric guitars on the whole album; arrangements on Le Berceau De la Vie; music on Électrocardiogramme Plat, Hot Chaud and Aux Héros De La Voltige (EMI)
 2001 Freak Out Total (with Ouba) (Gear Fab, Compilation)
 2005 Jacques Higelin – Entre 2 gares (Compilation).  Michel Pagliaro : guitars (EMI)

See also

Music of Canada
Music of Quebec
Canadian rock
List of Canadian musicians

References

External links
 Michel Pagliaro official site
 2007 Radio-Canada interview with Christiane Charette (French)
 Watch Pag, a 2008 documentary short, National Film Board of Canada

1948 births
Living people
Canadian rock singers
Canadian rock guitarists
Canadian male guitarists
Canadian male singer-songwriters
Canadian singer-songwriters
Songwriters from Quebec
Singers from Montreal
Writers from Montreal
French-language singers of Canada
Governor General's Performing Arts Award winners
Columbia Records artists
RCA Records artists